Halina Maria (Helena) Jaroszewiczowa (7 November 1892 Dziewanowo, Płock Governorate – 21 June 1940) was a Polish politician in the 20th-century, who was killed in the Palmiry massacre. She was a member of the Sejm.

References 

1892 births
1940 deaths
People from Płock County
People from Płock Governorate
Nonpartisan Bloc for Cooperation with the Government politicians
Members of the Sejm of the Second Polish Republic (1930–1935)
Senators of the Second Polish Republic (1935–1938)
20th-century Polish women politicians
Polish people executed by Nazi Germany
Polish civilians killed in World War II